Jungle West 11 is a 1964 book by Majbritt Morrison. The book was published through Tandem Books and focused on Morrison's life and her account of the Notting Hill race riots, specifically the attack on her on Blechynden Street.

The book has seen multiple publications and was re-published in the Netherlands in 2008, 44 years after its first printing in 1964.

Reaction to the book
Novelist Stewart Home questioned the validity of the claims in the book, saying: "While Morrison appears to have existed she was probably unable to produce a convincing account of her personal experiences because she received too much useful advice about content from an editor who was keen to help her write a best seller."

Publications
 Jungle West 11, Tandem Books, UK - 1964
 Jungle West 11 (reprint), London, 1964 (as Majbritt Viola Morrison)
 Jungle West 11 mijn leven als licht meisje in Londen, De Arbeiderspers, Netherlands - 1966
 Jungle West 11, Award Books - A271S K - United States - 1967
 Jungle West 11, Standaard - . - 2008

References

1964 non-fiction books
Autobiographies